Hypotia orphna is a species of snout moth in the genus Hypotia. It was described by Mark I. Falkovitsh in 1976 and is known from the Kyzylkum Desert in Central Asia.

References

Moths described in 1976
Hypotiini